The Kabardino-Balkarian Autonomous Soviet Socialist Republic was an autonomous republic of the Russian Soviet Federative Socialist Republic within the Soviet Union, and was originally a part of the Mountain Autonomous Soviet Socialist Republic. On 16 January 1922 the region was detached from the Mountain ASSR and the Kabardino-Balkarian Autonomous Oblast on 1 September 1921. It became an autonomous republic on 5 December 1936. On 30 January 1991, the Kabardino-Balkarian ASSR declared state sovereignty. It is now the Kabardino-Balkaria republic, a federal subject of the Russian Federation. The Kabardino-Balkarian ASSR bordered no other sovereign states during the existence of the Soviet Union.

Like the Chechen-Ingush Autonomous Soviet Socialist Republic, the Kabardino-Balkarian ASSR was shared by two nationalities. Both autonomous republics resided as part of the Russian Soviet Federative Socialist Republic and featured Russians as the ethnic majority.

History
The Russian, Ottoman and Persian Empires fought for the region between the 17th and 19th centuries, during which the region was under Russian control. After the October revolution, the region joined the Mountain Autonomous Soviet Socialist Republic in 1921, during the Russian Civil War. The territories were detached from the Mountain ASSR to the Kabardino-Balkarian Autonomous Oblast in 1922, and on 5 December 1936 it was renamed the Kabardino-Balkarian Autonomous Soviet Socialist Republic.

In 1944, Joseph Stalin accused the Balkars of cooperating with Nazi Germany, men of military age suspected of being collaborators were deported to internment camps in Central Asia. Stalin ceded the Baksan valley to the Georgian SSR. "Balkar" was dropped from the state's name, which was renamed to the Kabardin ASSR. After the war's end, most of those interned were allowed to return, except those who actually were involved in anti-Soviet conspiracies. In 1957, the original name of Balkar-Kabardin ASSR was restored.

Geography
The Kabardino-Balkarian Autonomous Soviet Socialist Republic was located in the North Caucasus mountains.

Rivers
The main rivers include the Terek River (623 km), Malka River (216 km), Baksan River (173 km), Urukh River (104 km), and Cherek River (76 km).

Lakes
More than 100 lakes are located in the borders, although none of them has very large surface area. Most of the lakes are located in the mountains, formed by glacial processes. Lakes located on a plain include Tambukan Lake.

Mountains
Mount Elbrus (5,642 m) is volcanic and the highest peak in the Caucasus.

Other major mountains include Mount Dykhtau (5,402 m), Mount Koshkhatau (5,151 m), and Mount Shkhara (5,068 m).

Resources
Along with timber, the mining of minerals such as iron, molybdenum, gold, coal, tungsten, and lead were a main industry in the Kabardino-Balkarian ASSR. The region also has a great abundance of mineral water.

See also
First Secretary of the Kabardino–Balkarian Communist Party
Flag of the Kabardino-Balkarian Autonomous Soviet Socialist Republic

References

Autonomous republics of the Russian Soviet Federative Socialist Republic
History of Kabardino-Balkaria
States and territories established in 1936
States and territories disestablished in 1989
1936 establishments in the Soviet Union
1989 disestablishments in the Soviet Union
Former socialist republics